"Jealous Girls" is a single by the band Gossip. It is the third single from their album Standing in the Way of Control and was released on August 20, 2007.

The cover was designed by David Lane. Different covers were designed for different formats featuring different stills from the song's video.

Track listing

UK CD single
 "Jealous Girls" (Album version)
 "Jealous Girls" (Live version)
 "Coal to Diamonds"
 "Jealous Girls" (Video)

UK 7-inch single
 "Jealous Girls" (Album version)
 "Jealous Girls" (New Young Pony Club Mix)

UK 7-inch single 2
 "Jealous Girls" (Live version)
 "Jealous Girls" (Tommie Sunshine's Brooklyn Fire Retouch)

Personnel
 Beth Ditto – vocals
 Brace Paine – guitar, bass guitar
 Hannah Blilie – drums, backing vocals

Charts

References

2005 songs
2007 singles
Gossip (band) songs
Songs written by Beth Ditto
Songs written by Hannah Blilie